Man Mohan Singh Ahuja (1929 – 12 July 1998) was Indian physician and endocrinologist.

He was born in 1929 in Multan in British India. He was graduated from Madras Medical College in 1952. He passed M.R.C.P. (London) in 1956, and did residency at Hammersmith Hospital, London. In 1958, he joined All India Institute of Medical Sciences as Registrar in Medicine department under Prof. K. L. Wig. He was promoted as Associate Professor and later as Head of the Department of Medicine in 1969. He became Head of the Department of Endocrinology and Metabolism, when it was formed in 1982 until 1989. He was Dean of the Institute in 1988–1989.

He played key role in founding 'Research Society for the Study of Diabetes in India' in 1972 and 'Hormone Foundation, India.' He was the founding editor of International Journal of Diabetes in Developing Countries.

He was Chief editor of medical publication series on "Progress in Clinical Medicine in India". They are unique and monumental documentations of scientific work done in India on problems of Indian Medicine. Many generations of Medical students have been benefited from these volumes.

He died on 12 July 1998 in New Delhi. He was survived by his wife Dr. Meera Ahuja, daughter Sumati and son Vikas.

Awards
 He was awarded the prestigious B. C. Roy Award for Medical Research in 1982.
 Government of India awarded Padma Shri in 1991.

References

1929 births
1998 deaths
Recipients of the Padma Shri in medicine
Academic staff of the All India Institute of Medical Sciences, New Delhi
Indian endocrinologists
Dr. B. C. Roy Award winners
20th-century Indian medical doctors
People from Multan
Medical doctors from Punjab, India